The 1824 United States presidential election in Illinois took place between October 26 and December 2, 1824, as part of the 1824 United States presidential election. Voters chose three representatives, or electors to the Electoral College, who voted for President and Vice President.

During this election, the Democratic-Republican Party was the only major national party, and four different candidates from this party sought the Presidency. Although Illinois voted for John Quincy Adams over Andrew Jackson, Henry Clay, and William H. Crawford, the district-based system used for choosing electors meant that only one of the state's electoral votes were assigned to Adams, while the remaining two were assigned to Jackson. Adams won Illinois by a margin of 5.23%.

Results

See also
 United States presidential elections in Illinois

References

Illinois
1824
1824 Illinois elections